Swenoda may refer to:

Swenoda Lake, a lake in Pope County, Minnesota
Swenoda Township, Swift County, Minnesota